Laurent Samer is a Saint-Martinois footballer who currently plays for FC Concordia of the Saint-Martin Championships and the Saint Martin national football team.

Club career
Samer currently plays for FC Concordia of the Saint-Martin Championships. He has played for the club since at least 2012. During the 2012/13 season, he scored six goals in the club's six matches and was ranked 8th in the league in that statistic. For the 2013/14 season, he led the team in scoring with 12 goals. He serves as the club's captain.

International career
Samer was called up as part of Saint Martin's 28-man preliminary squad for 2012 Caribbean Cup qualification. However, he did not appear in any of Saint Martin's three matches. He made his international debut on 16 August 2014 in a friendly against the British Virgin Islands. He scored a pair of goals as Saint Martin earned a 4–2 victory. The match was also Saint Martin's first fixture since 2012 and was the territory's first step in making a full return to the Caribbean football scene.

International goals
Scores and results list Saint Martin's goal tally first.

References

External links
SMFA profile
Caribbean Football Database profile

Living people
Association football forwards
Saint Martinois footballers
Saint Martin international footballers
Year of birth missing (living people)